Events from the year 1927 in the United States.

Incumbents

Federal Government 
 President: Calvin Coolidge (R-Massachusetts)
 Vice President: Charles G. Dawes (R-Illinois)
 Chief Justice: William Howard Taft (Ohio)
 Speaker of the House of Representatives: Nicholas Longworth (R-Ohio)
 Senate Majority Leader: Charles Curtis (R-Kansas)
 Congress: 69th (until March 4), 70th (starting March 4)

Events

January–March
 January 7 – The first transatlantic telephone call is made from New York City to London.
 February 23 – The U.S. Federal Radio Commission (later renamed the Federal Communications Commission) begins to regulate the use of radio frequencies.
 March 11 
In New York City, the Roxy Theater is opened by Samuel Roxy Rothafel.
The first armoured car robbery is committed by the Flatheads Gang near Pittsburgh, Pennsylvania.

April–June

 April 19 – Actress-playwright Mae West is sentenced to ten days incarceration for "corrupting the morals of youth" for her comedy-drama Sex after 375 performances on Broadway.
 April 22–May 5 – The Great Mississippi Flood of 1927 affects 700,000 people in the greatest national disaster in U.S. history at this time.
 April 30 – The Federal Industrial Institute for Women opens near Alderson, West Virginia, as the first federal prison for women in the U.S.
 May 2 – Buck v. Bell decided in the Supreme Court of the United States, permitting compulsory sterilization of people with intellectual disability.
 May 11 – The Academy of Motion Picture Arts and Sciences, the "Academy" in "Academy Awards," is founded.
 May 14 – The University of Chicago's local collegiate organization, Phi Sigma, becomes incorporated under the laws of the State of Illinois as Eta Sigma Phi, the National Honorary Classical Fraternity.
 May 17 – Army aviation pioneer Major Harold Geiger dies in the crash of his Airco DH.4 de Havilland plane, at Olmsted Field, Pennsylvania.
 May 18 – Bath School disaster: Bombings by a disaffected local official result in 45 deaths, mostly children, in Bath Township, Michigan.
 May 20–21 – Aviator Charles Lindbergh makes the first solo non-stop trans-Atlantic flight, from New York to Paris in the single-seat, single-engine monoplane Spirit of St. Louis.
 May 23 – Nearly 600 members of the American Institute of Electrical Engineers and the Institute of Radio Engineers view the first live demonstration of television at the Bell Telephone Building in New York.
 May 26 – The final Model T rolls off the assembly line at the Ford Motor Company factory in Highland Park, Michigan, ending a run of 19 years and 15 million cars.
 June 13 – A ticker-tape parade is held for aviator Charles Lindbergh down Fifth Avenue in New York City.

July–September
 August 2 – U.S. President Calvin Coolidge announces, "I do not choose to run for president in 1928."
 August 7 – The Peace Bridge opens between Fort Erie, Ontario, and Buffalo, New York.
 August 23—After six years of appeals, as protests rage in capital cities around the world, Nicola Sacco and Bartolomeo Vanzetti are electrocuted at midnight in Charlestown, Massachusetts.
 August 26 – Paul Redfern leaves Brunswick, Georgia, flying his Stinson Detroiter Port of Brunswick to attempt a solo non-stop flight to Rio de Janeiro, Brazil. He later crashes in the Venezuela jungle (the crash site is never located).
 September 18 – The Columbia Phonographic Broadcasting System (later known as CBS) is formed and goes on the air with 47 radio stations.
 September 29 – 79 are killed and 550 are injured when a tornado strikes the St. Louis, Missouri area; it is the second-costliest and at least 24th-deadliest tornado in U.S. history.

October–December

 October 6 – The Jazz Singer opens in the United States and becomes a huge success, leading to the end of the silent film era.
 October 8 – Murderer's Row: The New York Yankees complete a 4-game sweep of the Pittsburgh Pirates in the World Series.
 October 28 – Pan American Airways' first flight takes off from Key West, bound for Havana.
 November 3–4 – Floods devastating Vermont incur the "worst natural disaster in the state's history".
 November 4
 Frank Heath and his horse Gypsy Queen return to Washington, D.C., having completed a 2-year journey of 11,356 miles to all 48 states.
 The 7.3  Lompoc earthquake affected the central coast of California with a maximum Mercalli intensity of VIII (Severe), causing a tsunami and moderate damage.
 November 10 – Unexplained explosions occur in Canton, Ohio.
 November 13 – The Holland Tunnel opens to traffic as the first Hudson River vehicular tunnel linking New Jersey to New York City.
 November 14 – The Pittsburgh Gasometer Explosion: Three Equitable Gas storage tanks in the North Side of Pittsburgh, Pennsylvania, explode, killing 26 people and causing damage estimated between contemporary totals of $4 million and $5 million.
 December 2 – Following 19 years of Ford Model T production, the Ford Motor Company unveils the Ford Model A as its new automobile.
 December 15 – Marion Parker, 12, is kidnapped in Los Angeles. Her dismembered body is found on December 19, prompting the largest manhunt to date on the West Coast for her killer, William Edward Hickman, who is arrested on December 22 in Oregon.
 December 17 – The U.S. submarine S-4 is accidentally rammed and sunk by the United States Coast Guard destroyer John Paulding off Provincetown, Massachusetts, killing everyone aboard after several unsuccessful attempts to raise the sub.
 December 27 – Kern and Hammerstein's musical play Show Boat, based on Edna Ferber's novel, opens on Broadway and goes on to become the first great classic of the American musical theatre.

Undated
 The Voluntary Committee of Lawyers is founded in New York to bring about the repeal of Prohibition of alcohol in United States.

Ongoing
 Lochner era ( – )
 U.S. occupation of Haiti (1915–1934)
 Prohibition (1920–1933)
 Roaring Twenties (1920–1929)

Births

January

 January 1
 Vernon L. Smith, American economist, Nobel Prize laureate
 Doak Walker, American football player (d. 1998)
 January 2 – Gino Marchetti, American football player (d. 2019)
 January 4 
 Lauro Cavazos, American politician and educator 
Barbara Rush, American actress
 January 5 – Sivaya Subramuniyaswami, American guru and author (d. 2001)
 January 10
 Arthur Kramer, American lawyer (d. 2008)
 Johnnie Ray, American singer, pianist and songwriter (d. 1990)
 January 13 – Brock Adams, American politician (d. 2004)
 January 15 – Phyllis Coates, American actress 
 January 17
 Thomas Anthony Dooley III, American physician, humanitarian (d. 1961)
 Eartha Kitt, African-American singer, actress, activist, and author (d. 2008)
 Harlan Mathews, American politician (d. 2014)
 January 22
 Lou Creekmur, American football player (d. 2009)
 Joe Perry, African-American football player (d. 2011)
 January 23
 Robert L. Butler, American politician (d. 2019)
 Ernest Hawkins, American football coach (d. 2018)
 January 24
 Paula Hawkins, American politician (d. 2009)
 Marvin Kaplan, American actor (d. 2016)
 January 25
 Marian Brown, American celebrity icon (d. 2013)
 Vivian Brown, American celebrity icon (d. 2014)
 January 27
 Bob DeMoss, American football player (d. 2017)
 Richard Fulton, American politician (d. 2018)
 January 28 – Vera Williams, American author and illustrator (d. 2015)
 January 31 – Jean Speegle Howard, American actress (d. 2000)

February

 February 1 – Galway Kinnell, American poet (d. 2014)
 February 2
 Stan Getz, American jazz saxophonist (d. 1991)
 Doris Sams, American professional baseball player (d. 2012)
 February 3 – Kenneth Anger, American actor, director and screenwriter 
 February 6 
 William Gardner Smith, American novelist and journalist (d. 1974)
 Art Stewart, American baseball executive and scout (d. 2021)
 February 8 – George Taliaferro, American football player (d. 2018)
 February 10 – Leontyne Price, African-American soprano
 February 11 – Nalda Bird, American professional baseball player (d. 2004)
 February 12
 Ann Gillis, American actress (d. 2018)
 Rita Meyer, American professional baseball player (d. 1992)
 H. M. Wynant, American actor 
 February 13 – Buck Hill, American jazz tenor, soprano saxophonist (d. 2017)
 February 15 – Harvey Korman, American actor and Comedian (d. 2008)
 February 17 – John Selfridge, American mathematician (d. 2010)
 February 18 – John Warner, American politician
 February 20
 Roy Cohn, American lawyer, anti-Communist (d. 1986)
 Sidney Poitier, Bahamian-American actor, film director (d. 2022)
 February 21
 Patricia Benoit, American actress (d. 2018)
 Erma Bombeck, American humorist (d. 1996)
 February 22
 Donald May, American actor
 Guy Mitchell, American singer and actor (d. 1999)
 February 23 – Paul W. Schroeder, historian (d. 2020)
 February 24 – Mark Lane, American conspiracy theorist (d. 2016)
 February 25 
 Dick Jones, actor, singer (d. 2014)
 Ralph Stanley, American bluegrass banjo player and vocalist (d. 2016)
 February 26 – Tom Kennedy, American game show host

March

 March 1
 George O. Abell, American astronomer, professor at UCLA, science popularizer, and skeptic (d. 1983)
 Harry Belafonte, Jamaican-American musician, actor, and civil rights activist
 Robert Bork, American conservative law professor (d. 2012)
 March 3 – Harry Whittington, American lawyer, real estate investor and political figure (d. 2023)
 March 4
 Phil Batt, American politician (d. 2023)
 Thayer David, American actor (d. 1978)
 Robert Orben, American comedy writer
 Dick Savitt, American tennis player
 March 5 – Jack Cassidy, American actor and singer (d. 1976)
 March 6
 William J. Bell, American soap creator (d. 2005)
 Gordon Cooper, American astronaut (d. 2004)
 Mel Groomes, American football player (d. 1997)
 March 7 – James Broderick, American actor (d. 1982)
 March 8 – Dick Hyman, American composer, pianist
 March 9 – Jackie Jensen, American baseball player (d. 1982)
 March 10 – Bill Fischer, American football offensive lineman (d. 2017)
 March 11 – Gloria Blackwell, African-American civil rights activist and educator (d. 2010)
 March 13 – Robert Denning, American interior designer (d. 2005)
 March 15
 Annastasia Batikis, Greek-American female professional baseball player (d. 2016)
Aaron Rosand, American violinist (d. 2019)
Carl Smith, American country music singer (d. 2010)
 March 16 – Daniel Patrick Moynihan, American author, politician, and statesman (d. 2003)
 March 18 – George Plimpton, American writer and actor (d. 2003)
 March 20 – Earlene Risinger, American professional baseball player (d. 2008)
 March 21 – Jerome Chazen, American businessman (d. 2022)
 March 27 – Lorry I. Lokey, American businessman and philanthropist (d. 2022)
 March 29 
 Donn Kushner, American Canadian scientist and writer (d. 2001)
 John Mclaughlin, American television and radio host (d. 1974)
 March 31
 César Chávez, American labor activist, United Farm Workers founder (d. 1993)
 William Daniels, American actor

April

 April 1 – Amos Milburn, American R&B singer-songwriter and pianist (d. 1980)
 April 2 
 Rita Gam, American actress (d. 2016)
 Ken Sansom, actor, singer, and voice actor (d. 2012)
 Rembert Weakland, American monk
 April 6 – Gerry Mulligan, American musician (d. 1996)
 April 10 – Marshall Warren Nirenberg, American biochemist and geneticist (d. 2010)
 April 12 – Alvin Sargent, American screenwriter (d. 2019)
 April 15 – Robert Mills, American physicist (d. 1999)
 April 16
 John Chamberlain, American sculptor (d. 2011)
 Doris McLemore, linguist (d. 2016) Her mother was Wichita and her father was European-American.
 Peter Mark Richman, American actor (d. 2021)
 April 17 – Junior Collins, American-French horn player (d. 1976)
 April 18 – Samuel P. Huntington, American political scientist (d. 2008)
 April 20 – Phil Hill, American race car driver (d. 2008)
 Anita Darian, American singer, actress (d. 2015)
 Harry Gallatin, American basketballer, coach (d. 2015)
 Jackie Robinson, American Olympic basketball player 
 April 26 – Harry Gallatin, American basketball player and coach (d. 2015)
 April 27 – Coretta Scott King, African-American civil rights activist (d. 2006)
 April 28 – William Lewis Moore, American postal worker (d. 1963)
 April 29 – Big Jay McNeely, R&B saxophonist (d. 2018)

May

 May 4 – Hal Hudson, American baseball player (d. 2016)
 May 5 – Pat Carroll, American actress (d. 2022)
 May 10 – Mike Souchak, American golfer (d. 2008)
 May 13
 Fred Hellerman, American folk singer (d. 2016)
 Herbert Ross, American film director (d. 2001)
 May 19 – John Thompson, American football executive (d. 2022)
 May 20 
 Bud Grant, American football player and coach (d. 2023)
 David Hedison, American actor (d. 2019)
 May 21 – Chuck Stewart, American photographer (d. 2017)
 May 22 
 Michael Constantine, American actor (d. 2021)
 George D. Gould, American financier (d. 2022)
 May 24 – William Ennis Thomson, American music educator (d. 2019)
 May 25 – Robert Ludlum, American novelist (d. 2001)
 May 27 
 Ralph Carmichael, American composer and arranger (d. 2021)
 Robert E. Finnigan, American scientist (d. 2022)
 May 28 – William A. Hilliard, American journalist (d. 2017)
 May 30 – Clint Walker, American actor (d. 2018)

June

 June 1 – Joseph Z. Nederlander, American theater owner and operator (d. 2021)
 June 3 – Boots Randolph, American saxophone player (d. 2007)
 June 8 – Jerry Stiller, American actor (d. 2020)
 June 9 – George Nigh, American politician
 June 10 – Eugene Parker, American astrophysicist (d. 2022)
 June 11 – John W. O'Malley, American Catholic historian, author and Jesuit priest 
 June 17
 Austin Murphy, American politician 
 Wally Wood, American cartoonist (d. 1981)
 June 18 – Bud Brown, American politician 
 June 19 – John Glenn Beall, Jr., American politician (d. 2006)
 June 21 – Carl Stokes, American politician (d. 1996)
 June 23 – Bob Fosse, American choreographer (d. 1987)
 June 24 – Martin Lewis Perl, American physicist, Nobel Prize laureate (d. 2014)
 June 25
 Gerald Freedman, American theatre director, librettist, lyricist and college dean (d. 2020)
 Chuck Smith, American pastor (d. 2013)
 June 27
 John Barber, American professional basketball player
 Bobby Myers, American NASCAR driver (d. 1957)
 June 28
 Dick Lane, American professional baseball player (d. 2018)
 Frank Sherwood Rowland, American chemist, Nobel Prize laureate (d. 2012)
 June 29 
 Roy Radner, American economist
 Bert Hubbard, American synchronized swimmer, choreographer and coach
 Kenneth Snelson, American contemporary sculptor, photographer (d. 2016)
 June 30
 Shirley Fry Irvin, American tennis player
 Frank McCabe, American basketball player

July

 July 1 
 Winfield Dunn, American politician
 Joseph Martin Sartoris, American Catholic prelate
 July 3 – Tim O'Connor, American actor (d. 2018)
 July 4 – Neil Simon, American playwright (d. 2018)
 July 5 
 Robert E. Jones, American politician and judge
 Thomas Fleming, American military historian, historical novelist (d. 2017)
 July 6
 Janet Leigh, American actress, singer, dancer, and author (d. 2004)
 Pat Paulsen, American comedian and actor (d. 1997)
 July 7
 Alan Dixon, American politician (d. 2014)
 George C. Lodge, American politician 
 Charlie Louvin, American country singer and songwriter (d. 2011)
 Doc Severinsen, American jazz trumpeter
 July 9 
 Ed Ames, American singer and actor (Ames Brothers)
 Alma Carlisle, African-American architect and architectural historian
 July 10
 David Dinkins, African-American politician (d. 2020)
 Jack Kelley, American ice hockey coach (d. 2020)
 July 14 – Mike Esposito, American comic book artist (d. 2010) 
 July 15 – Joe Turkel, actor (d. 2022)
 July 16
 Mindy Carson, American singer
 Jules Witcover, American journalist, author, and columnist
 July 18 – Don Bagley, American bassist Midge Decter
 July 19
 Tom Blake, American football player (d. 2020)
 Billy Gardner, American professional baseball player, coach and manager
 July 20 – Robert Wahl, American football player 
 July 21 
 William Liller, American astronomer (d. 2021)
 Dick Smith, American baseball player (d. 2021)
 July 24 – Alex Katz, American painter 
 July 25 – Midge Decter, American journalist and author (d. 2022)
 July 27
 Guy Carawan, American folk musician and musicologist (d. 2015)
 Will Jordan, American character actor (d. 2018)
 July 28 – John Ashbery, American poet (d. 2017)

August

 August 1 – Warren Wolf, American football player (d. 2019)
 August 4
 Eddie Kamae, American ukuleleist (d. 2017)
 Johnny Maddox, American pianist (d. 2018)
 Del Shankel, American microbiologist, academic administrator (d. 2018)
 Jess Thomas, American tenor (d. 1993)
 August 6 – William D. Ford, American politician (d. 2004)
 August 7
 Rocky Bridges, American middle infielder, third baseman (d. 2015)
 Edwin W. Edwards, American politician
 Art Houtteman, American baseball player (d. 2003)
 Carl Switzer, American actor (d. 1959)
 August 8
 Johnny Temple, American baseball player (d. 1994)
 Jim Weaver, American politician (d. 2020)
 August 9 – Marvin Minsky, American computer scientist (d. 2016)
 August 10 – W. Sterling Cary, African-American Christian minister (d. 2021)
 August 11 – Stuart Rosenberg, American director (d. 2007)
 August 12
 Elgen Long, American aviator, world record holder, author (d. 2022)
 Porter Wagoner, American country singer (d. 2007)
 August 15 – Carmela Marie Cristiano, American Roman Catholic nun (d. 2011)
 August 17 – F. Ray Keyser Jr., American lawyer, politician (d. 2015)
 August 18 – Rosalynn Carter, 39th First Lady of the United States
 August 19
 Jim Broyhill, American politician
 L. Q. Jones, American actor
 August 21 – Thomas S. Monson, American religious leader, 16th president of the Church of Jesus Christ of Latter-day Saints (d. 2018)
 August 23 – Allan Kaprow, American painter and performance artist (d. 2006)
 August 24 – Harry Markowitz, American economist
 August 25 – Althea Gibson, African-American tennis player (d. 2003)
 August 26 – Sam Massell, American businessman (d. 2022)
 August 29
 A. Ross Eckler Jr., American logologist, statistician and author (d. 2016)
 Jimmy C. Newman, American country singer and songwriter (d. 2014)
 August 30
 William G. Curlin, American Roman Catholic prelate (d. 2017)
 Bill Daily, American actor and comedian (d. 2018)
 Buford A. Johnson, African-American World War II pilot (d. 2017)

September

 September 1 – Bob DiPietro, American baseball player (d. 2012)
 September 2 – Gene Rhodes, American basketball player and coach (d. 2018)
 September 3 
 Robert J. Birnbaum, American finance executive, president of the New York Stock Exchange (d. 2022)
 John Hamman, close-up magician, inventor, Marianist brother (d. 2000)
 Wayne Peterson, composer (d. 2021)
 September 4 – John McCarthy, American computer and cognitive scientist (d. 2011)
 September 5 – Paul Volcker, American economist, academic (d. 2019)
 September 8
 Marguerite Frank, American-French mathematician 
 Harlan Howard, American country singer, songwriter
 September 9 – Elvin Jones, African-American jazz drummer (d. 2004)
 September 11
 Christine King Farris, African-American civil rights activist
 G. David Schine, American businessman (d. 1996)
 September 15 
 Norm Crosby, American comedian
 John M. Jacobus Jr., American art historian (d. 2017)
 Margaret Keane, artist (d. 2022)
 September 16
 Peter Falk, American actor (d. 2011)
 Jack Kelly, American actor (d. 1992)
 September 17 – George Blanda, American football quarterback, placekicker (d. 2010)
 September 19
 Harold Brown, American nuclear physicist, 14th United States Secretary of Defense (d. 2019)
 William Hickey, American actor (d. 1997)
 Nick Massi, American bassist for 'The Four Seasons' (d. 2000)
 September 21
 Owen Aspinall, American attorney and politician (d. 1997)
 Joan Hotchkis, American actress, writer and performance artist
 September 22
 Kika de la Garza, American politician (d. 2017)
 Tommy Lasorda, American baseball manager (d. 2021)
 September 23 – Thomas Vose Daily, American Roman Catholic prelate (d. 2017
 September 28
 Paul L. Brady, American civil rights advocate, author and federal judge
 James Lyons, American admiral (d. 2018)
 James W. Symington, American politician 
 September 29 – Pete McCloskey, American politician 
 September 30 – W. S. Merwin, American poet (d. 2019)

October

 October 1 – Tom Bosley, American actor (d. 2010)
 October 5
 John W. Downey, American composer, conductor, pianist and educator (d. 2004)
 Al Hansen, American artist (d. 1995)
 October 6 – Alice Bauer, American golfer (d. 2002)
 October 7 
 James Bishop, American artist (d. 2021)
 Al Martino, American singer and actor (d. 2009)
 October 10 – Dana Elcar, American actor, director (d. 2005)
 October 11 – William Perry, American mathematician, engineer and businessman 
 October 13 
 Anita Kerr, American singer and arranger (d. 2022)
 Lee Konitz, American jazz composer, alto saxophonist (d. 2020)
 October 18 – George C. Scott, American actor (d. 1999)
 October 19 – Red McCombs, American billionaire 
 October 20 – Joyce Brothers, American psychologist (d. 2013)
 October 23 – Barron Hilton, American socialite and businessman
 October 24 – Cal Hogue, American baseball player (d. 2005)
 October 25
 William Acker, American judge (d. 2018)
 Barbara Cook, American soprano musical singer (d. 2017)
 October 27 – Dominick Argento, American composer and educator (d. 2019)
 October 29 – William Cousins, American judge (d. 2018)

November

 November 2 – Steve Ditko, American comic book artist (d. 2018)
 November 3 – Peggy McCay, American actress (d. 2018)
 November 4 – Bobby Breen, Canadian-born American actor and singer (d. 2016)
 November 5 – Howard Terpning, American painter and illustrator 
 November 8 – Patti Page, American singer (d. 2013)
 November 11 – Mose Allison, American jazz and blues pianist and singer-songwriter (d. 2016)
 November 12 – Jack Butler, American football player (d. 2013)
 November 13 – John Pont, American football player and coach (d. 2008)
 November 14 
 Betty Brewer, American actress 
 McLean Stevenson, American actor (M*A*S*H) (d. 1996)
 November 16 – Barbara Payton, American actress (d. 1967)
 November 17 – Lynn Stalmaster, American casting director 
 November 18
 Hank Ballard, American musician (d. 2003)
 Lawrence Moss, American composer
 November 19 – John Hulett, African American civil rights activist (d. 2006)
 November 20 – Estelle Parsons, American actress
 November 21
 Georgia Frontiere, American co-owner of the Los Angeles/St. Louis Rams (d. 2008)
 Gordon Christian, American ice hockey player (d. 2017)
 November 23 – Guy Davenport, American writer and graphic artist (d. 2005)
 November 26
 John Carter, American actor (d. 2015)
 Ernie Coombs, American-Canadian entertainer (d. 2001)
 November 27
 William E. Simon, American businessman, 63rd Secretary of the Treasury (d. 2000)
 José de Jesús Madera Uribe, American Roman Catholic bishop (d. 2017)
 November 29
 Rupert Crosse, African-American actor (d. 1973)
 Vin Scully, American sportscaster (d. 2022)
 November 30 – Robert Guillaume, African-American actor and singer (d. 2017)

December

 December 3 – Andy Williams, American singer (d. 2012)
 December 8 – Ferdie Pacheco, American physician and author (d. 2017)
 December 10 – Bob Farrell, American motivational speaker, author, and founder of Farrell's Ice Cream Parlour and Restaurant (d. 2015)
 December 12 – Robert Noyce, American co-founder of Intel (d. 1990)
 December 13 – James Wright, American poet (d. 1980)
 December 14 – Hershel McGriff, American stock car racing driver
 December 18 – Ramsey Clark, American politician, lawyer (d. 2021)
 December 20 – Charlie Callas, American comedian, singer (d. 2011)
 December 23 – Edith Irby Jones, African-American physician (d. 2019)
 December 24 – Mary Higgins Clark, American novelist (d. 2020)
 December 25
 Nellie Fox, American baseball player (d. 1975)
 Leo Kubiak, American basketball player 
 December 26 – Alan King, American actor, comedian (d. 2004)
 December 27 – Genevieve Audrey Wagner, American professional baseball player, physician (d. 1984)
 December 29 – Andy Stanfield, American athlete (d. 1985)

Deaths 
 January 26 – Lyman J. Gage, financier and Presidential Cabinet Officer (b. 1836)
 February 7 – Walter Guion, U.S. Senator from Louisiana in 1918 (b. 1849)
 February 13
 Brooks Adams, historian (b. 1848)
 Vive Lindaman, professional baseball player (b. 1877)
 February 20 – George McClellan, U.S. Representative from New York (b. 1856)
 February 25 – David Baird Sr., U.S. Senator from New Jersey from 1918 to 1919 (b. 1839 in Ireland)
 March 4 – Ira Remsen, chemist (b. 1846)
 March 11 – August Paulsen, Danish-American businessman and philanthropist (b. 1871)
 April 25 – Earle Williams, actor (b. 1880)
 May 6 – Hudson Maxim, inventor and chemist (b. 1853) 
 May 17 – Harold Geiger,  aviation pioneer (b. 1884)
 May 23 – Henry E. Huntington, railroad magnate (b. 1850)
 June 9 – Victoria Woodhull, American leader of the woman's suffrage movement (b. 1838)
 June 15 – William Joseph Deboe, U.S. Senator from Kentucky from 1897 to 1903 (b. 1849)
 July 17 – Florence Roberts, actress (b. 1871)
 August 15 – B. B. Comer, 33rd Governor of Alabama from 1907 to 1911 and U.S. Senator from Alabama in 1920 (b. 1848)
 September 7 – Mary Canfield Ballard, poet and hymn-writer (b. 1852)
 September 20 – George Nichols, American actor and director (b. 1864)
 September 27 – Leopold Wharton, film director (b. 1870)
 September 30 – Charles Kilpatrick, one-legged trick cyclist (b. 1869)
 October 21 – William Bromwell Melish, business president and Freemason leader.
 December 3 – Orrin Dubbs Bleakley, U.S. House of Representatives from Pennsylvania (b. 1854)
 December 18 – Nicholas Fessenden, politician (b. 1847)

See also
 1927 in American television
 List of American films of 1927
 Timeline of United States history (1900–1929)

References

External links
 

 
1920s in the United States
United States
United States
Years of the 20th century in the United States